The 2009–10 season is Hyderabad cricket team's 76th competitive season. The Hyderabad cricket team is senior men's domestic cricket team based in the city of Hyderabad, India, run by the Hyderabad Cricket Association. They represent the region of Telangana in the state of Andhra Pradesh in domestic competitions.

Competition Overview

Squads
 Head Coach : Venkatapathy Raju
 Fielding Coach : Noel David

Rayudu, Anirudh and Absolem returned from the Indian Cricket League to play for the Hyderabad while Raju replaced Kanwaljit Singh as the Hyderabad coach ahead of the 2009–10 season.

 Irani Cup
Ojha got selected to the Rest of India squad for the 2009 Irani Cup, a first-class cricket competition in India.

Duleep Trophy
Absolem and Abhinav got selected to the South Zone squad for the 2009-10 Duleep Trophy, a first-class cricket tournament in India.

Deodhar Trophy
Ojha and Rayudu got selected to the South Zone squad for the 2009-10 Deodhar Trophy, a List-A cricket competition in India.

Indian Premier League
The local franchise, Deccan Chargers included Ashish and Anirudh to their squad and retained Arjun Yadav, Ravi Teja, Laxman, Ojha and Suman while the Mumbai Indians added Rayudu and the Rajasthan Royals added Quadri for the 2010 Indian Premier League, a professional Twenty20 cricket league in India.

Syed Mushtaq Ali Trophy
The Hyderabad team, led by Arjun Yadav, began their campaign in the maiden edition of the Syed Mushtaq Ali Trophy, a Twenty20 tournament in India, with a win against Andhra at Visakhapatnam on 25 September 2009. The half-centuries from Ambati Rayudu and Abhinav Kumar helped the Hyderabad reach a total of 176 while the couple of wickets from Mungala Arjun and Pragyan Ojha helped them to overcome the unbeaten half-century from Gnaneswara Rao to win the match over the Andhra by 10 runs. The rest of the Hyderabad's South Zone matches were washed out due to the incessant rains at Visakhapatnam which led them to finish inside top-2 in the South Zone to advance to the knockout stage with a win and four no-results. In the quarterfinal, the Mumbai had posted a strong total of 181 with the help of an unbeaten half-century from Siddharth Chitnis and a 24-ball 46 from Paul Valthaty but an unbeaten century from Akshath Reddy along with some useful contributions from Anoop Pai and Danny Dereck Prince eased the chase for the Hyderabad as they defeated the Mumbai with seven wickets to spare. The Hyderabad reached the final of the tournament with the help from Vivek Krishna's four-wicket haul and the collective contribution from their batsmen as they easily chased the Delhi's target of 158 with five wickets to spare. The Hyderabad batsmen faltered while chasing in the low-scoring final as they were troubled by the Maharashtra opening bowlers, Samad Fallah and Kishor Bhikane and were bowled out for 100 to end the tournament as the Runners-up. Earlier, the Hyderabad troubled the Maharashtra batsmen with three-wicket hauls from Hanuma Vihari and Akash Bhandari but the useful contributions from Rohit Motwani and Digambar Waghmare helped the Maharashtra reach the total of 119 which proved to be enough in the end as they won the match by 19 runs.

Points Table
South Zone

Knockout stage

Matches
Zonal Stage

Quarter-final

Semi-final

Final

Statistics
Most runs

 Source: Cricinfo
Most wickets

 Source: Cricinfo

Ranji Trophy

The Hyderabad team, led by V. V. S. Laxman, began their campaign in the Ranji Trophy, the premier first-class cricket tournament in India, with a draw against the Himachal Pradesh at Hyderabad on 3 November 2009. After the second match, Laxman was fined 20% of his match fee while rest of his team-mates were fined 10% of their match fee for the slow over-rate during the Punjab's second innings. Arjun Yadav led the team after two matches as Laxman was selected for the Sri Lanka tour of India. They finished last in Group A of the Super League with no wins, no losses and seven draws and got relegated for the first-time ever to the Plate League for the 2010–11 Ranji Trophy.

Points Table
Super League Group A

  Top three teams advanced to knockout stage.
  Bottom team relegated to Plate League for 2010–11 Ranji Trophy.
 Points system : Win by an innings or 10 wickets = 6, Win = 5, Draw with first innings lead = 3, Draw with first innings deficit = 1, No Result = 1, Loss = 0.

Matches
Group Stage

Statistics
Most runs

 Source: Cricinfo
Most wickets

 Source: Cricinfo

Vijay Hazare Trophy
The Hyderabad team, led by Arjun Yadav, began their campaign in the Vijay Hazare Trophy, a List-A cricket tournament in India, with a win against the Andhra at Chennai on 10 February 2010. The Hyderabad bowlers started brightly removing the Andhra top-order cheaply but Siva Kumar's unbeaten knock of 67 in 41 balls in the end helped the Andhra post 201 in 50 overs. After surviving early scare of losing two quick wickets, Dwaraka Ravi Teja and Anirudh Singh struck half-centuries before Doddapaneni Kalyankrishna caused the middle-order collapse for Hyderabad. However, Amol Shinde and Alfred Absolem helped the Hyderabad complete the chase in the penultimate over. In the second match, the centuries from both openers, Abhishek Hegde and VA Jagadeesh and a quick knock of 88 in 29 balls from Raiphi Gomez that includes 34 runs in the last over off Ravi Teja helped the Kerala post a mammoth total 358 in 50 overs. Ravi Teja scored a century in reply for the Hyderabad but no support on the other end apart from Ambati Rayudu's 48 forced the Hyderabad lose by 55 runs. The Hyderabad's collapse at the end after the half-centuries from Rayudu and Akshath Reddy and Anirudha Srikkanth's maiden List-A century for the Tamil Nadu ensured that the Tamil Nadu defeat the Hyderabad by eight wickets in the third match. In the fourth match, the century from Akshath and the half-centuries from Rayudu and Neeraj Bist helped the Hyderabad post 310 in 50 overs but Amit Yadav's maiden century and collective effort from the rest ensured the Goa chase the target in the penultimate over. The Hyderabad got the good start in the chase of 318 in their final zonal match with 54 from Rayudu and 40 from Ravi Teja but the Karnataka spinners derailed their chase in the middle bowling the Hyderabad out for 236 though there was Bist's unbeaten knock of 70 at the end. Earlier, Karnataka posted a 300-plus score, thanks to Robin Uthappa's 51 at the start and C. M. Gautam's unbeaten knock of 68. This loss eliminated the Hyderabad from the tournament as they finished fifth in the South Zone and failed to qualify for the knockout stage with a win and four losses.

Points Table
South Zone

Matches
Zonal Stage

Statistics
Most runs

 Source: Cricinfo
Most wickets

 Source: Cricinfo

See also
Hyderabad cricket team 
Hyderabad Cricket Association

References

External links
Hyderabad cricket team official site

Cricket in Hyderabad, India
Cricket in Telangana
Sport in Telangana